Postplatyptilia biobioica is a moth of the family Pterophoridae. It is known from Chile.

The wingspan is about 19 mm. Adults are on wing in January.

References

biobioica
Moths described in 1991
Endemic fauna of Chile